The following is a list of squads for each nation competing at the 2014 African Nations Championship in South Africa.

Group A

South Africa

Mali
Coach: Djibril Dramé

Mozambique

Nigeria
Coach: Stephen Keshi

Group B

Zimbabwe

Coach: Ian Gorowa

Morocco
Coach: Hassan Benabicha

Uganda
Coach:  Milutin Sredojević

Burkina Faso
Coach: Brama Traoré

Group C

Ghana
Coach Maxwell Konadu

Congo

Libya
Coach:  Javier Clemente

Ethiopia
Coach: Sewnet Bishaw

Group D







Burundi
Coach:  Lofty Naseem

References

Squads
African Nations Championship squads